Shooting at the 1980 Summer Paralympics consisted of eleven events.

Medal summary

References 

 

1980 Summer Paralympics events
1980
Paralympics
Shooting competitions in the Netherlands